The Coastal forests of eastern Africa, also known as the East African Coastal Forests, is a tropical moist forest region along the east coast of Africa. The region was designated a biodiversity hotspot by Conservation International.

The forests extend in a narrow band along the coast of the Indian Ocean, from southern Somalia in the north, through coastal Kenya and Tanzania to the mouth of the Limpopo River in southern Mozambique.

The World Wildlife Fund divides the coastal forests into two ecoregions: the Northern Zanzibar-Inhambane coastal forest mosaic, which extends from southern Somalia through coastal Kenya to southern Tanzania, and includes the islands of Zanzibar and Pemba, and the Southern Zanzibar-Inhambane coastal forest mosaic, which extends from southern Tanzania along the Mozambique coast to the mouth of the Limpopo.

Gallery

See also
 Arabuko Sokoke National Park
 KwaZulu-Cape coastal forest mosaic
 Maputaland coastal forest mosaic

External links
Coastal Forests of Kenya and Tanzania (Tanzania Forest Conservation Group)
Coastal forests of eastern Africa (Conservation International)

African Wild Dog Conservancy's Biodiversity Hotspots Page

Afrotropical realm
Tropical and subtropical moist broadleaf forests
Forests and woodlands of Africa
Endemic Bird Areas